Krista Elyse Hidalgo Sullivan (born May 3, 1991), better known by her stage name Bela Padilla, is a Filipino-British actress, film producer, film director, screenwriter, television host, and brand ambassador.

She is best known for Television dramas GMA-7 and her official home Network ABS-CBN and Critically-Acclaimed Films such as 100 Tula Para Kay Stella and Meet Me in St Gallen with JC Santos opposite Carlo Aquino and The Day Before Valentines third film and On Vodka her and Beers and Regrets her fourth film with JC Santos in 2022 her directorial debut in the film 366 is opposite Zanjoe Marudo and JC Santos for film studio Viva Films in 2017 she wrote the screen play for the Joyce Bernal film “Last Night”starring Toni Gonzaga and Piolo Pascual. In addition to becoming a film favorite she has pushed her writing and directorial skills for future projects.

Early life and education
Padilla (born Krista Elyse Hidalgo Sullivan) was born to British Cornelius Gary Sullivan and wife Margarette Cariño Hidalgo ("Meg"). Her mother Meg is a maternal first-degree cousin to Robin Padilla. Her father was divorced from his first wife. She has three elder half-siblings in England from her father's first family while she also has an elder brother from both of her parents. She first attended a Montessori education-style international school in Forbes Park, Makati, before attending the foreigners class of Colegio San Agustin – Makati. Padilla took up journalism as an elective in senior high school.

Padilla's maternal grandmother is the sister of Eva Cariño-Padilla, wife of actor-director and former Camarines Norte governor Roy Padilla Sr. She is the niece, of second degree consanguinity, to actors Rommel Padilla, Robin Padilla and BB Gandanghari, and second cousin to RJ and Daniel Padilla (sons of Rommel) and Queenie and Kylie Padilla (daughters of Robin). She is a practicing Jehovah's Witness.

Career
Padilla was discovered by ABS-CBN talent scout Jet Valle after the latter saw her on one of her field trips and introduced her to ABS-CBN via Star Magic Batch 15 and adopted the stage name Krista Valle. The same year she got her first TV role in the teen drama Star Magic Presents: Abt Ur Luv Ur Lyf 2. She later changed her stage name to her real name Krista Sullivan when she started working as a freelance actress. In 2009, she played a minor role in the TV series Totoy Bato. She then became a cast regular on the third season of Lokomoko High in TV5.

In 2010, she left Star Magic, replaced her manager with Claire dela Fuente and moved to GMA-7. Along with the move, she also finally changed her stage name to Bela Padilla.

In 2011, Bela was awarded the Miss Friendship and the Media's Darling awards in the Asian Super Model Contest that was held in Guilin and Nanning in the Guangxi Zhuang Autonomous Region of China, on 6 and 7 September.

In March 2012, Padilla was at the center of a controversy when her FHM Philippines magazine cover was withdrawn due to accusations of racism.

In 2015, Padilla returned to ABS-CBN after signing an exclusive contract with Dreamscape Entertainment Television, one of ABS-CBN's famous TV assets, and played the role of Carmen in the hit teleserye FPJ's Ang Probinsyano, inspired from the Fernando Poe Jr. film of the same title, co-starring Coco Martin, Maja Salvador and Susan Roces.

In 2019, Bela Padilla starred in Sino ang Maysala?: Mea Culpa as Juris.

Personal
On November 24, 2021, Bela revealed that she relocated to the UK.

Filmography

Television

Film

Music video appearances

Awards and nominations

References

External links
 

1991 births
Living people
Filipino child actresses
Filipino Christians
Filipino film actresses
Filipino people of British descent
Filipino people of English descent
Filipino people of Irish descent
Filipino television actresses
People of Saint Helenian descent
Star Magic
ABS-CBN personalities
GMA Network personalities
Viva Artists Agency